Silk Skin Paws is an EP by English rock band Wire. It was released in 1988. The cover sticker describes the EP as a "specially priced mini-album for the Wire connoisseur."

Track listing 

 12" vinyl/CD EP version
 "Silk Skin Paws (Full Length Version)" (remix by Dave Allen)
 "German Shepherds"
 "Ambitious (Remix)"
 "Come Back in Two Halves (Rerecorded)"

 7" single version
 "Silk Skin Paws (7" Remix)"
 "German Shepherds"

References

External links 

 

Wire (band) EPs
1988 EPs
Mute Records EPs